Valentyna Semenivna Shevchenko (12 March 1935 – 3 February 2020) was the Chairperson of the Presidium of Supreme Soviet of the Ukrainian SSR.

Biography
Shevchenko was born the daughter of a miner, Semen Solianyk, in Kryvyi Rih, Dnipropetrovsk Oblast, Soviet Union.

From 1975 to 1985, Shevchenko was deputy chairperson of the Supreme Council Presidium of the Ukrainian SSR. After the death of Oleksiy Vatchenko, she began acting as the chairwoman until her official appointment on petition of Volodymyr Shcherbitsky.

In 1989 Shevchenko refused to sign prohibition against the People's Movement of Ukraine.

From September 1997 on she was the honorary president of the National Fund of social defence of mothers and children: "Ukraine – children".

Shevchenko died on 3 February 2020 at the age of 84.

See also 
 President of Ukraine
 Verkhovna Rada

References

External links
 An interview of Valentyna Shevchenko (in Ukrainian)

Politicians from Kryvyi Rih
1935 births
2020 deaths
Ninth convocation members of the Verkhovna Rada of the Ukrainian Soviet Socialist Republic
Tenth convocation members of the Verkhovna Rada of the Ukrainian Soviet Socialist Republic
Eleventh convocation members of the Verkhovna Rada of the Ukrainian Soviet Socialist Republic
Head of Presidium of the Verkhovna Rada of the Ukrainian Soviet Socialist Republic
Presidium of the Supreme Soviet
Members of the Congress of People's Deputies of the Soviet Union
Communist Party of Ukraine (Soviet Union) politicians
Taras Shevchenko National University of Kyiv alumni
Recipients of the Order of Prince Yaroslav the Wise, 5th class
Recipients of the Order of Princess Olga, 3rd class
Recipients of the Order of Princess Olga, 2nd class
Recipients of the Order of Princess Olga, 1st class
Recipients of the Order of Friendship of Peoples
Soviet women in politics
20th-century Ukrainian women politicians
20th-century Ukrainian politicians
21st-century Ukrainian women politicians
21st-century Ukrainian politicians
Women members of the Verkhovna Rada